Valmiki is a 1963 Indian Kannada-language film, directed by C. S. Rao and produced by S. K. Habeebulla. The film stars Rajkumar, Kantha Rao, Narasimharaju and Rajanala Kaleswara Rao. The film has musical score by Ghantasala. The movie is based on the life of Valmiki.

S. K. Bhagavan who was initially the co- director of the movie had to let go of the opportunity as he was also supposed to be involved with greater responsibility in Mantralaya Mahatme and hence suggested he be replaced with S. Siddalingaiah. Director C. S. Rao and Jupiter Pictures made the film simultaneously in Telugu with the same title starring N. T. Rama Rao in the lead role retaining most of the cast and crew. Kanta Rao appeared as Lord Rama in a song sequence in both versions. Veteran actress, Urvashi Sharada made her Kannada debut through this film.

Cast

Rajkumar
Kantha Rao
Narasimharaju
Rajanala Kaleswara Rao
Raghuramaiah
Mikkilineni
Srikanth
A. V. Subba Rao
Dr. Shivaramakrishnaiah
Dharmaraj
Jagga Rao
Koteshwar Rao
Sampath
Basha
Shando Krishna
Raja Sulochana
Leelavathi
M. N. Lakshmi Devi
Sharada 
Shakunthala
B. Jaya
Padmini
Shashikala
Pramila
Kousalya

Soundtrack
The music was composed by Ghantasala Venkateswara Rao.

References

External links
 

1963 films
1960s Kannada-language films
Hindu mythological films
Indian multilingual films
Films directed by C. S. Rao
Films scored by Ghantasala (musician)
1960s multilingual films